Daniel J. Hunt is an American politician serving as a member of the Massachusetts House of Representatives from the 13th Suffolk district.

Early life and education 
Hunt was born in the Dorchester neighborhood of Boston. He graduated in 1999 from Boston Latin Academy. He earned a Bachelor of Science degree in business and management economics from the Carroll School of Management at Boston College and a Juris Doctor from the Suffolk University Law School.

Career 
From 2008 to 2011, Hunt was the chief of staff for Representative Daniel E. Bosley. He was an organizer for the John Kerry 2004 presidential campaign.

He is the former director of governmental affairs at the state Department of Conservation and Recreation. Hunt was elected to the Massachusetts House of Representatives in 2014, succeeding Marty Walsh.

Among Hunt's actions was the filing, at the request of a constituent, of Bill H.3719 on May 6, 2019 outlawing the use of the word "bitch". If passed into law, use of the word would carry penalties of $150 fine for a first offense and $200 or six months in prison for subsequent offenses. The bill was given a hearing by the Joint Committee on the Judiciary on October 22, 2019.

See also
 2019–2020 Massachusetts legislature
 2021–2022 Massachusetts legislature

References

External links
Daniel Hunt Member Profile

Democratic Party members of the Massachusetts House of Representatives
Living people
Politicians from Boston
Carroll School of Management alumni
Suffolk University Law School alumni
Year of birth missing (living people)
21st-century American politicians
Boston Latin Academy alumni